Nalle Karlsson is a Swedish songwriter, record producer and entrepreneur. He is based in Stockholm, Sweden. 
In 2003, he formed the band The Sunshine whose music has been featured in many American television shows including Grey's Anatomy, CSI Miami, Brothers and Sisters and commercials for Jaguar and Coca-Cola.
Karlsson has collaborated with artists including Carolina Liar (Atlantic), Anouk (EMI), Rigo, Fantastic Four and The Edges.

In 2011, Karlsson and Johan Harrysson founded a music production company called Blame Us. They create music for television, film and commercials. Their clients include VW, IKEA, EF, Top Gear USA, ESPN, Lindex and Telenor.

Selected work

Library Music

References

Swedish songwriters
Living people
Year of birth missing (living people)